= Joan Kent =

English author

Joan Mabel Whibley (née Coultrip, 19 April 1922 – October 2001), who used the pseudonym Joan Kent, was an English author.

Several collections of her autobiographical stories, depicting country life in Kent in the interwar years, were published, including Binder Twine & Rabbit Stew (1976), Wood Smoke and Pigeon Pie (1977), Hay Wains & Cherry Ale (1980), and Lamplight On Cottage Loaves (1993).
